Buena Vista, Wisconsin may refer to:

 Buena Vista, Grant County, Wisconsin
 Buena Vista, Portage County, Wisconsin
 Buena Vista, Richland County, Wisconsin
 Buena Vista, Waukesha County, Wisconsin

See also
 Buena Vista (disambiguation)